Kateryna Polovinchuk (born 24 November 1995 in Kyiv) is a Ukrainian pool player. She has won Ukrainian national championships across different disciplines 20 times, and in 2016 she was runner-up in the European Eight-ball Championship.

Career

Pool
Kateryna Polovinchuk was born on 24 November 1995. In June 2010, she became Ukrainian junior champion in all four disciplines (Straight pool, Eight-ball, Nine-ball, Ten-ball). In December 2010, Polovyntschuk beat Viktorija Nahorna 6-3 and became Ukrainian champion for the first time, shortly after her 15th birthday.

In 2011 she won all four titles at the Ukrainian Junior Championship.

In 2012 she was again four times national junior champion.  At the 2012 Ukrainian championship, she won the straight pool with a 75–55 final victory over Viktorija Nahorna. In nine-Ball she defended her title with a 7–1 final victory against Alina Holubjewa. Polovinchuk won in three disciplines at the 2013 Ukrainian Junior Championship. However, she lost the 10-ball final to Ljubow Schyhailowa. At the Ukrainian championship in 2013 she won the titles in straight pool, ten-ball, and for the third consecutive year in nine-ball. When she last participated in the Ukrainian Junior Championship, in 2014, she won all four championship titles for the fourth time. At the end of 2014 she became Ukrainian champion in straight pool and eight-ball after final victories against Ljubow Schyhailowa. In December 2015 she became Ukrainian champion in all disciplines, winning in all four finals against Viktorija Nahorna.

At the 2016 European Pool Championships, Polovinchuk reached the final in eight-ball, in which she lost 3–6 to Kristina Tkach 3–6 despite having taken a 3–1 lead.

In September 2017, she won the Kaunas Open with a 7–1 final victory against the Lithuanian Evaldas Sutkus. She later reached the semi-finals at the Klagenfurt Open and was eliminated against Chen Siming. At the 2017 Ukrainian Championship, she took part in three of the four competitions and reached the final three times, each time meeting Daryna Sirantschuk. After Polovinchuk had become Ukrainian champion endlessly for the sixth time in a row in straight pool and for the fourth time in a row in eight-ball, she lost 6–7 in the nine-ball final.

Snooker
In December 2014, Polovinchuk became Ukrainian champion, with a 3–2 final victory over Daryna Sirantschuk.

Personal life
Polovinchuk studied at the Economics and Business Faculty of Mykolas Romeris University, graduating at the top of her class in January 2019.

Achievements
Source: tournamentservice.net (unless otherwise stated)

Pool

European – youth
Nine-ball European Youth Champion (women): 2013

National Championships – girls
Ukrainian Eight-ball champion (girls): 2010, 2011, 2012, 2013, 2014
Ukrainian Nine-ball champion (girls): 2010, 2011, 2012, 2013, 2014
Ukrainian Ten-ball champion (girls): 2010, 2011, 2012, 2014
Ukrainian Straight pool champion (girls): 2010, 2011, 2012, 2013, 2014

National Championships – women
Ukrainian Eight-ball champion (women): 2010, 2011, 2014, 2015, 2016, 2017
Ukrainian Nine-ball champion: 2011, 2012, 2013, 2015, 2019
Ukrainian Ten-ball champion (women): 2011, 2013, 2015
Ukrainian Straight pool champion (women): 2012, 2013, 2014, 2015, 2016, 2017

Other
Mezz Cues Baltic Pool League 2016 Stage IV (women)
Kaunas Open – women & seniors: 2017
Mezz Cues Baltic Pool League 2018 stage I (women)
Pro Cup II stage (B category): 2018
Mezz Cues Baltic Pool League 2018 stage II (women)
Kaunas Open 2018 (Seniors)
Mezz Cues Baltic Pool League 2018 stage IV (women)
2019 Tete-a-Tete Casino Cup (veteran women)

Snooker
Ukrainian champion : 2014

References

External links
 Videos (kozoom.com)

Ukrainian pool players
Female pool players
1995 births
Living people
Mykolas Romeris University alumni